John Johnson may refer to:

Academia
John de Monins Johnson (1882–1956), scholar and printer
John Wesley Johnson (1836–1898), first president of the University of Oregon
John P. Johnson (academic administrator), fifth president of Embry-Riddle Aeronautical University
John R. Johnson (1900–1983), American chemist
John Bertrand Johnson (1887–1970), scientist–engineer after whom Johnson noise is named
John Johnson (astronomer), (born 1977), current Harvard professor

Artists and entertainers
John Johnson (composer) (c. 1545–1594), English lutenist and composer
John Johnson (musician) (born 1964), trombonist and percussionist with Simply Red
John Johnson (reporter) (born 1938), American television reporter and anchor
J. Rosamond Johnson (1873–1954), composer and opera singer
John Seward Johnson II (1930-2020), American artist
John Lee Johnson (born 1944), American drummer, better known by his stage names Jai Johanny Johanson and Jaimoe
John Seward Johnson III (born 1966), American filmmaker, philanthropist, and entrepreneur
John Lester Johnson (1893-1968), American boxer and actor

Architects
John Johnson (architect, born 1732) (1732–1814), English architect and surveyor
John Johnson (architect, born 1807) (1807–1878), English architect
John Johnson (architect, born 1843) (1843–1919), English architect

Sportspeople

American football
John Johnson (trainer) (1917–2016), American football athletic trainer for the New York Giants
John Henry Johnson (1929–2011), American football player
John Johnson (defensive tackle) (born 1941), American football player
John Johnson (linebacker) (born 1968), American football player
John Johnson (safety) (born 1995), American football player

Baseball
Lou Johnson (pitcher) (John Louis Johnson, 1869–1941), Major League pitcher
John Wesley Johnson (baseball), American baseball player of the 1920s and 1930s
John Wesley Johnson Jr. (1916–1944), American baseball player
John Henry Johnson (baseball) (born 1956), Major League pitcher
Jack Johnson (second baseman) (John Thomas Johnson, 1883–1940), American baseball player

Other sports
Jack Johnson (boxer) (John Arthur Johnson, 1878-1946), American boxer and first black heavyweight champion
John Johnson (cricketer, born 1809) (1809–1877)), English cricketer
John Johnson (cricketer, born 1871) (1871–1930), English cricketer
John S. Johnson (sportsman) (1873–1934), American cyclist and speed skater
John Johnson (rugby league), rugby league footballer of the 1930s
John Johnson (basketball, born 1947) (1947–2016), American basketball player
John Johnson (basketball, born 1956), American basketball player
John Michael Johnson (born 1968), American bantamweight boxer
John Johnson (footballer) (born 1988), English footballer
John Lester Johnson, American boxer and actor

Lawyers
John Alvin Johnson (1915–2005), U.S. lawyer and businessman
John Calhoun Johnson (died 1876), practiced law and operated a ranch in California
John G. Johnson (1841–1917), U.S. corporate lawyer and art collector
John Henry Johnson (patent attorney) (1828–1900)

Military figures
John Johnson, 8th Seigneur of Sark (died 1723), Seigneur of Sark, 1720–1723
Sir John Johnson, 2nd Baronet (1741–1830), loyalist leader during the American Revolution
Liver-Eating Johnson (1824–1900), American frontier figure
John Johnson (Medal of Honor, 1839) (1839–?), United States Navy sailor
John Johnson (Medal of Honor, 1842) (1842–1907), Norwegian-American Medal of Honor recipient
John D. Johnson (general) (born 1952–), U.S. Army general
John P. Johnson (general) (born 1963), U.S. Army general

Politicians and public servants

United States
John Johnson (Ohio congressman) (1805–1867), politician
John A. Johnson (Minnesota politician) (1883–1962), Minnesota politician
John Albert Johnson (1861–1909), 16th governor of Minnesota
John Anders Johnson (1832–1901), Wisconsin state senator and assemblyman from Madison
John E. Johnson (Brandon) (1873–1951), Wisconsin state assemblyman from Brandon, Wisconsin
John E. Johnson (Utica) (fl. circa 1868), Wisconsin state assemblyman from Utica, Wisconsin
John Johnson (Mississippi politician) (1920–2002), Mississippi state representative and senator
John J. Johnson (1926–2016), Missouri state senator
John Kelly Johnson (1841–1894), Iowa state court judge and legislator 
John Warren Johnson (1929-2023), Minnesota state legislator
John Telemachus Johnson (1788–1856), U.S. Representative from Kentucky
John Johnson (Kansas City mayor) (1816–1903), mayor of Kansas City, Missouri
J. Neely Johnson (1825–1872), California politician and politician
John Johnson (b. 1833) (1833–1892), Wisconsin State Assemblyman from York, Dane County, Wisconsin
John Johnson (Ohio state representative) (born 1937), former member of the Ohio House of Representatives
John Johnson (New Jersey), mayor of Paterson, New Jersey
John Johnson Sr. (1770–1824), Chancellor of Maryland
John Johnson Jr. (1798–1856), Chancellor of Maryland
John Johnson (Indiana judge) (1776–1817), associate justice of the Indiana Supreme Court
John T. Johnson (Oklahoma judge) (1856–1935), associate justice of the Oklahoma Supreme Court
John B. Johnson (politician) (1885–1985), American politician in the South Dakota State Senate
John Ramsey Johnson (born 1945), associate judge of the Superior Court of the District of Columbia
J. B. Johnson (Florida politician) (1868–1940), 23rd Florida Attorney General
John S. Johnson (politician) (1854–1941), member of the North Dakota House of Representatives
John D. Johnson (politician), member of the Utah State Senate

Other countries
John Johnson, alias of John Cornelius (MP) (died 1567), English politician
Johno Johnson (1930–2017), Australian politician
John Mercer Johnson (1818–1868), Canadian politician
John Johnson (diplomat) (1930–2018), British colonial administrator and diplomat
John Smoke Johnson (1792–1886), Mohawk chief
John William Fordham Johnson (1866–1938), lieutenant governor of British Columbia
John Johnson (British politician) (1850–1910), British trade unionist and politician
John Mordaunt Johnson (c. 1776–1815), British diplomat around the time of the Napoleonic Wars
John George Johnson (1829–1896), British Member of Parliament for Exeter

Religious figures
John Johnson (theologian) (1662–1725), English clergyman and theologian
John Johnson (baptist) (1706–1791), English minister, founder of the Johnsonian Baptists
John Johnson (clergyman) (1769–1833), Church of England clergyman, poet, and editor
John Johnson (Latter Day Saints) (1778–1843), early Latter Day Saint and owner of the John Johnson Farm, a historical site in Mormonism
Enmegahbowh (c. 1820–1902), also known as John Johnson, first Native American Episcopal priest

Others
John Johnson (explorer), Arctic explorer and World War II veteran
John Johnson (inventor) (1813–1871), American pioneer photographer and inventor
John O. Johnson (1875–1963), American boat builder, aviator and inventor
John H. Johnson (1918–2005), founder of the Johnson Publishing Company (Ebony and Jet magazines)
John H. Johnson (baseball) (1921–1988), minor league baseball executive
John Seward Johnson I (1895-1983), founded the Harbor Branch Oceanographic Institution
Guy Fawkes (1570–1606) or John Johnson
John Johnson, one of the Colchester Martyrs
John & Thomas Johnson, a soap and alkali manufacturing business in Runcorn, Cheshire, England

See also
Johnnie Johnson (disambiguation)
Johnny Johnson (disambiguation)
Jack Johnson (disambiguation)
J. Erik Jonsson (1901–1995), businessman and mayor of Dallas
John Johnston (disambiguation)
Jon Johnson (born 1954), American sound editor
Jon Jonsson (disambiguation)
Jonathan Johnson (disambiguation)
John Johnsen (disambiguation)